ʿAwn ibn ʿAbd Allāh ibn Jaʿfar (Arabic: عون بن عبدالله بن جَعفر), known as Awn al-Akbar (died October 10, 680), was a son of Zaynab who accompanied Husayn ibn Ali on his journey from Mecca to Kufa. He was martyred on the Day of Ashura.

Lineage 
Awn was a son of Zaynab, Husayn's sister, and Abd Allah ibn Ja'far ibn Abi Talib who was a companion of the Prophet. Awn's grandfather was Ja'far al-Tayyar who was appointed by the Prophet as the chief of Muslims in their migration to Abyssinia.  Abd Allah had two sons called Awn: Awn al-Akbar whose mother was Zaynab and Awn al-Asghar whose mother was Jamana, daughter of Musayyib ibn Najba.

Accompanying Husayn ibn Ali 
When Abd Allah ibn Ja'far learned about Husayn's departure to Kufa, he wrote a letter to Imam to convince him to return to Mecca. Abd Allah sent his letter to Imam by his sons Awn and Muhammad. When Abd Allah found that Imam was determined in his decision, advised his sons Awn and Muhammad to accompany him and fight along with Husayn.

On the day of Ashura 
After Muhammad was martyred, Awn went to the battlefield. According to Ibn Shahr Ashub, he killed 3 horsemen and 18 foot soldiers from the army of Umar ibn Sa'd and finally was martyred by Abd Allah ibn Qutba.

References 

Husayn ibn Ali
Hussainiya
People killed at the Battle of Karbala
680 deaths